The Mayagüez Metropolitan Statistical Area is a United States Census Bureau defined Metropolitan Statistical Area (MSA) in west central Puerto Rico. A July 1, 2009 Census Bureau estimate placed the population at 109,842, a 4.53% decrease from the 2000 census figure of 115,048.

Of the eight metropolitan areas in the Commonwealth, Mayagüez has experienced the largest population decline during the 2000–2009 period. The only other MSA to have lost population during this same period is Ponce.

Municipalities
A total of two municipalities (Spanish: municipios) are included as part of the Mayagüez Metropolitan Statistical Area.

Mayagüez (Principal city) Pop: 73,077
Hormigueros Pop: 15,654

Combined Statistical Area

The Mayagüez–San Germán–Cabo Rojo Combined Statistical Area (CSA) includes two metropolitan areas and six municipalities. A July 1, 2009 Census Bureau estimate placed the population at 258,401, a 2.84% increase over the 2000 census figure of 251,260. The Mayagüez–San Germán–Cabo Rojo Combined Statistical Area comprises 6.5% of Puerto Rico's total population.

Components
Metropolitan Statistical Areas (MSAs)
Mayagüez (2 Municipalities)
San Germán-Cabo Rojo (4 Municipalities)

See also
Puerto Rico census statistical areas

References

 
Metropolitan areas of Puerto Rico